Stuff is a New Zealand news website. It has won numerous awards at New Zealand's Newspaper Publishers' Association awards (previously branded as the Qantas Media Awards and currently as the Voyager Media Awards) including Best News Website in 2014 and 2019, and Website of the Year in 2013 and 2018.

References 

New Zealand news websites
Stuff